Devil's Pulpit may refer to:

Places 
 The end of a gorge on the Mühlauer Bach, Tyrol, Austria
 A rock formation and golf course in Caledon, Ontario, Canada
 Devil's Pulpit, Gloucestershire, England
 A rock formation in Finnich Glen, Stirlingshire, Scotland

Germany 
Various features named Teufelskanzel

 A rock formation in the Bode Gorge, Saxony-Anhalt
 A rock formation on the Brocken, Saxony-Anhalt
 A rock formation in the Frickenhofer Höhe, Baden-Württemberg
 A rock formation on the mountain Kandel, Baden-Württemberg

United States 
 A rock formation in Bedford, New Hampshire
 A rock formation on Monument Mountain (Berkshire County, Massachusetts)
 A rock formation at Lehigh Gap, Pennsylvania
 A rock formation on Mount Diablo, Contra Costa County, California

Other
 The Devil's Pulpit, a book of sermons by the English Radical Robert Taylor